Shabbir Noori (born 23 February 1992) is an Afghan cricketer. Noori is a right-handed batsman and right-arm off break bowler who plays for the Afghanistan national cricket team.

Career
Noori represented the Afghanistan U-19 cricket team in 2007, making his debut against Malaysia in the ACC Under-19 Elite Cup.

In November 2009, Noori was a key member of Afghanistan's 2009 ACC Twenty20 Cup winning squad. During the tournament he made his unofficial Twenty20 debut against Singapore. This also marked his international debut for the senior squad.

In January 2010, Noori made his first-class debut for Afghanistan in the Intercontinental Cup against Ireland, where Noori made his maiden first-class half century by scoring 85 in Afghanistan's first innings. Noori scored 21 in their second innings, as Afghanistan won the match by seven wickets.

Later, in February 2010 he played in Afghanistan's Intercontinental Cup match against Canada. In the Afghan first innings he scored 60 opening the batting, although he was positioned down the order in Afghanistan's successful chase of 494.

International career
Following this match Noori made his One Day International debut against Canada at the Sharjah Cricket Association Stadium. Noori scored just 9 runs from number six. He was later named in Afghanistan's squad for the 2010 ICC World Twenty20.

References

External links

1992 births
Living people
Pashtun people
Cricketers from Nangarhar Province
Afghan cricketers
Afghanistan One Day International cricketers
Afghanistan Twenty20 International cricketers
Afghan expatriates in Pakistan
Asian Games medalists in cricket
Cricketers at the 2010 Asian Games
Band-e-Amir Dragons cricketers
Asian Games silver medalists for Afghanistan
Medalists at the 2010 Asian Games